The 2012 FIA GT1 Zolder round is an auto racing event held at the Circuit Zolder, Heusden-Zolder, Belgium on 20–22 April 2012, and is the second round of the 2012 FIA GT1 World Championship season.  It is the second time the FIA GT1 World Championship has visited Zolder, with defending race winners Markus Winkelhock and Marc Basseng returning for 2012 with All-Inkl.com Münnich Motorsport.  The event is supported by the FIA GT3 European Championship, the 2012 Supercar Challenge, and the Belgian Historic Cup.

Qualifying

Qualifying result
For qualifying, Driver 1 participates in the first and third sessions while Driver 2 participates in only the second session.  The fastest lap for each session is indicated with bold.

Notes:
 — The No. 9 Team China Porsche was demoted three grid spots for a crossing the pit exit blend line during Qualifying 3.

Races

Qualifying Race

Championship Race

References

Zolder
FIA GT1
Circuit Zolder